Mazhin Mianeh Sorkh (also Romanized as Māzhīn Mīāneh Sorkh) is a village in Nabovat Rural District, in the Central District of Eyvan County, Ilam Province, Iran. At the 2006 census, its population was 438, in 76 families. The village is populated by Kurds.

References 

Populated places in Eyvan County
Kurdish settlements in Ilam Province